The coat of arms of the Slovak Republic consists of a red (gules) shield, in early Gothic style, charged with a silver (argent) double cross standing on the middle peak of a dark blue mountain consisting of three peaks. Extremities of the cross are amplified, and its ends are concaved. The double cross is a symbol of its Christian faith and the hills represent three symbolic mountain ranges: Tatra, Fatra (made up of the Veľká Fatra and Malá Fatra ranges), and Matra (in southern Slovakia).

Modern design history

In 1990, the Slovak Interior Ministry tasked Ladislav Čisárik (a painter and heraldic artist) and Ladislav Vrtel (an expert in heraldry) with creating a new coat of arms and national flag in the aftermath of the Velvet Revolution. Čisárik and Vrtel based their designs for a modern coat of arms and flag on an existing 14th Century coat of arms. However, Čisárik and Vrtel chose to enlarge the double cross three times to emphasize it as a national symbol. In addition to the national coat of arms and the national flag, the duo also designed a new presidential standard, which incorporates the double cross as well.

Double cross 

One of the modern interpretations of the double cross is that it represents Slovakia as an heir and guardian of Christian tradition, brought to the region by St. Cyril and St. Methodius, two missionaries from the Byzantine Empire.

The two-barred cross in the Slovak coat of arms originated in the Byzantine (Eastern Roman) Empire in the 9th century. Unlike the Christian cross, the symbolism and meaning of the double cross is not well understood.  One interpretation is that the first horizontal line symbolized the secular power and the other horizontal line the ecclesiastic power of Byzantine emperors. Another that the first cross represents the death and the second cross the resurrection of Jesus Christ. In the Byzantine Empire of the 9th century, the double cross was a political symbol used by Byzantine clerks and missionaries.

The double cross arrived in the territory of current-day Slovakia probably no later than during the 9th century mission of Cyril and Methodius to Great Moravia. Though used frequently in Great Moravia, it was not a state symbol at that time, because there were no state symbols in the modern sense in Europe at that time yet. By means of Zwentibold (the ruler of Lorraine, son of the German emperor Arnulf of Carinthia and godchild of the Great Moravian king Svatopluk I), this symbol got to Lorraine and is called the cross of Lorraine there.

The double cross symbol appeared again in rudimentary features on the first coins that Stephen I, the first king of the Kingdom of Hungary (part of which now forms the territory of present-day Slovakia), had minted at an unknown place. Before he became king in 1000, he was the Grand Prince of the Principality of Hungary and was living there with his Bavarian wife Gisella. The frequent opinion that the double cross was a cross that the Pope granted to Stephen I. around 1000 is still disputed. The opinion arose only in the 15th century based on a legend from the 12th century, which in addition only says that Stephen received an apostolic cross (i.e. a normal, not a double cross).

The direct predecessor of the current coat of arms of Slovakia can be found in the coat of arms used by Béla, the prince of the Hungarian Duchy (1046–1060) and later King of Hungary. Béla was a member of the house of Árpáds and was named after the Prague bishop Adalbert, who had baptized King Stephen, the cousin of Béla's father, some decades earlier. Béla conducted his own internal and international policy in his Nitrian frontier principality. The Byzantine emperor, involved in a quarrel with the Hungarian king, even sent Béla a prince's crown to Nitra. Furthermore, Béla had own coins minted in 1050 in Nitra, the capital of his principality – coins which deliberately differed from those of the Hungarian king and which bore the double cross symbol.

The appearance of the double cross in coins before Béla III is highly disputed. According to recent view It is a simple misinterpretation of two normal crosses.

It was only 100 years later, around 1189, that the double cross is known to have been used again – it was used during a crusade of the Hungarian king Béla III as his royal symbol. The three hills seen in the modern Slovak and Hungarian coats of arms were still not present in the standard. This time, the symbol was already used as a coat of arms, because coats of arms became fashionable in Europe at that time. He chose the symbol, because it was a Christian symbol and because it was the oldest symbol used in his kingdom.

Béla's successors Emeric and Andrew II, however, did not use anymore the double cross, which was associated with the Nitrian frontier principality situated in the northern part of the kingdom and dissolved in 1107, as their symbol, but they used a red-and-white-stripes symbol associated with the House of Árpáds (see the coat of arms of Hungary for a picture).

King Béla IV used the patriarchal cross again – the reasons for this decision are unknown. Some historians suggest that he simply copied Béla III, his ideal, though this is only an assumption. At the time of his rule, the patriarchal cross also became the symbol of the Pozsony (Prešporok, Bratislava or Pressburg) county, although in a slightly modified form.

The last Árpád king, Andrew III (1290–1301), used only the patriarchal cross.

During the throne struggles after 1301, Ladislaus used the double cross as his symbol (see chapter "Three hills" for details), while Charles Robert of Anjou (1307–1342) used a bipartite coat of arms consisting of the Angevin symbol and the above-mentioned stripes symbol of King Stephen V, whose daughter Maria Charles Robert had married.

After the Mongol invasion in 1241–1242 many of the newly founded towns in the Kingdom of Hungary received the right to use the royal double cross as their coat of arms. The first, biggest and most towns of the kingdom arose in present-day Slovakia - the part of the kingdom that was characterized by German settlers, extensive mining activities and thus the most advanced economy at that time. It was probably partly due to this use in municipal coats of arm that the double cross became a clear symbol of the northern part of the kingdom again from the 15th century onwards and Upper Hungary from the 18th century.

From the late 14th century onwards (according to other sources from the 13th century), the double cross symbol was used both as a symbol for northern parts of the Kingdom ("partes Danubii septentrionales, partes regni superiores", i.e. approximately the territory of present-day Slovakia and northeastern Hungary) and as a symbol of kings of the Kingdom of Hungary. For example, the state symbol of Louis the Great (1342–1382) was a quartered coat of arms containing among other symbols the symbol of Charles Robert of Anjou (containing in turn the stripes symbol)  as the symbol for the southern parts of the kingdom ("partes regni inferiores") and the symbol for northern parts of the Kingdom (the double cross symbol). A good example of the double meaning of the double cross symbol is the great seal of King Sigismund of Luxembourg (1387–1437): This seal contains the double cross symbol in the middle, surrounded by a circle of smaller coats of arms of territories under his rule. These smaller coats of arms include the double cross symbol (for a second time!) as the symbol of what is today Slovakia and the stripes symbol as the symbol for Pannonia.

Since 1526, when the Habsburgs became kings of the Kingdom of Hungary, the current "combined" coat of arms of Hungary including the double cross symbol and the stripes symbol was used as the symbol of the Kingdom of Hungary (except that the small crown below the double cross was added only in the 17th century).

Three hills 

The triple peak represents the three mountain ranges Tatra, Matra and Fatra  which symbolized the northern mountainous part of the Kingdom of Hungary. (The Tatra and the Fatra ranges are in present day Slovakia.) This interpretation is probably the oldest and most frequent one – it can be traced back to the 16th century, but stems probably from the 15th century. According to István Werbőczy's "Tripartitum" from 16th century, the heaps represent the mountains in this order.

The three mountains below the double cross were used by King Ladislaus (1301–1305), who was crowned king of Hungary, but was a Czech from the house of the Přemyslids.

Symbol of the Slovaks

Origins and colors
Not later than in the 16th century, the Slovaks regarded the double cross also as a symbol of their nation. This fact manifested itself during the Revolution of 1848/1849, Slovaks were fighting along with the Austrians against the Hungarians (though many Slovaks chose to defend the Hungarian case). A "Slovak National Council" was established for this purpose in August 1848 in Vienna. The present-day coat of arms was used on the seal of this Slovak National Council for the first time officially as the national symbol of the Slovaks (instead of being the official symbol of Upper Hungary only). From that time onwards, the symbol has been used very frequently.

As for the colors, the colors are supposed to be the three "Slavic" colors red-white-blue (Slavic tricolor). Since the Upper Hungary coat of arms was already part of the coat of arms of the Kingdom of Hungary at that time, only the  color of the three mountains had to be changed (it happened on the Slovak flag for the first time) from green to "blue" to receive the red-white-blue combination.

As for the origin of the red color (in the Slovak and in the Hungarian coat of arms), the coat of arms has often had the red color as an almost inseparable attendant of the double cross in the coats of many Hungarian and Slovak towns since the Middle Ages. Also, the coat of arms of Béla III. is thought to have had red background. In general, red background color was used frequently for coats of arms in the late 12th and early 13th century in central Europe. One of the modern interpretations of the color is that it represents the bloody lining and symbolizes the Slovak 'martyrdom' during the time of Magyarisation (19th century).

The color of the three mountains was originally green but in 1848 the Slovak National Council used it as blue in accordance with the Slavic tricolor.

20th century
In 1918, Czechoslovak troops began occupying northern Hungary in accordance with the territorial promises that the Triple Entente made to Czechoslovak politicians during World War I. However, Slovakia (Upper Hungary) was occupied by Hungarian troops from the Hungarian Soviet Republic, who set up the Slovak Soviet Republic as a puppet regime. Its emblem was the red star, a symbol of communism. Following a brief war between Hungary, Czechoslovakia and Romania, Slovakia was incorporated into Czechoslovakia.

In 1920 the Slovak coat of arms became part of the state coat of arms of Czechoslovakia.

Between 1939 and 1945, it was the state symbol of the First Slovak Republic.

In 1945, it became part of Czechoslovakia's coat of arms again. From 1960 to 1990 the symbol was officially forbidden, because it was interpreted by the Communists as the symbol of the fascist Slovak State. The old coat of arms was replaced in the Czechoslovak coat of arms by an artificial symbol consisting of Mt. Kriváň and three flames. The three flames were supposed to symbolize the Slovak National Uprising of 1944.

On 1 March 1990, after the Velvet Revolution, the old coat of arms became the official symbol of the "Slovak Republic", which was still part of Czechoslovakia. Based on the Constitution of the Slovak Republic of September 3, 1992, the same coat of arms became the symbol of independent Slovakia, which arose on January 1, 1993. A law of February 18, 1993, precised the details of the coat of arms: for example, though not explicitly defined in the coat's blazon in the past, during the World War II era the cross mostly used to be depicted with convex endings of the stake and the bars; therefore the new description clearly reads to depict them as concave.

The coat of arms is used by the Slovak Air Force as its roundel.

Since 1992 the coat of arms is also placed on the Slovak flag.

Part of other symbols
In the 13th century King Béla III declared the double cross (ex post) a symbol of Saint Ladislaus (King Ladislaus I of Hungary). In 1386, it became part of the coat of arms of the house of Jagiello, because Grand Duke of Lithuania Jogaila took over the alleged coat of arms of Saint Ladislaus when being baptized as Ladislaus (Wladyslaw). By means of the Jagiellons, the symbol also got into the coat of arms of Lithuania.

The President of Slovakia uses a banner of these arms.

Historical coat of arms

See also 
Flag of Slovakia
Slovak euro coins
 Armorial of sovereign states

References

External links
 Heraldry and Genealogy Society of Slovakia

Slovakia
 
National symbols of Slovakia
Slovakia
Slovakia